Jean-Charles Skarbowsky (born March 10, 1975) is a French former kickboxer and 3-time European Muay Thai champion. Skarbowsky has been called one of the best farangs who have fought in Thailand.

Biography and career
His mother emigrated at age 25 from Romania to France. 

After a flying start to his career, both in France and Thailand, where he accumulated a number of quick victories, he broke his right hand in 1997 while defending his title again in Europe. After two years of forced shutdown, he resumed his career in 1999 and made a stunning return to the highest level, overcoming the pessimistic prognosis of the doctors.

In 2010, Skarbowsky appeared on the twelfth season of the American mixed martial arts reality television show The Ultimate Fighter, where he was the Muay Thai coach on Georges St-Pierre's team.

Titles and achievements

Titles
 2002 Winner Superbout Kings Cup
 2000 I.S.K.A. Muaythai World champion (65 kg)
 1999 Winner Kings Cup
 1995-1996 3-times European Muaythai champion
 1995 French Muaythai champion
 2000 Sports Writers Association of Thailand Fight of the Year (vs Robert Kaennorasing)

Ranking
 2006 N°1 Rajadamnern Stadium
 2005 N°4 Rajadamnern Stadium
 2003 N°1 Rajadamnern Stadium

Kickboxing record

|-  bgcolor="#FFBBBB"
| 2006-06-29 || Loss ||align=left| Big Ben Chor Praram 6 || Jarumueang Fights, Rajadamnern Stadium || Bangkok, Thailand || TKO (Ref stop/elbow strike) || 1 || 2:45 || 65-23-3
|-  bgcolor="#FFBBBB"
| 2006-05-20 || Loss ||align=left| Ole Laursen || K-1 Scandinavia Grand Prix 2006 || Stockholm, Sweden || Decision (Unanimous) || 4 || 3:00 || 65-22-3
|-  bgcolor="#c5d2ea"
| 2006-04-08 || Draw ||align=left| Farid Khider|| La Nuit des Superfights IV || Paris, France || Decision Draw || 5 || 3:00 || 65-21-3
|-  bgcolor="#CCFFCC"
| 2006-03-00 || Win ||align=left| Chalunlap || France vs Thailand || Levallois, France || Decision || 5 || 3:00 || 65-21-2
|-  bgcolor="#CCFFCC"
| 2006-01-05 || Win ||align=left| Lamsongkram Chuwattana || WMC Superfights, Rajadamnern Stadium || Bangkok, Thailand || KO (Punches) || 1 || || 64-21-2
|-
! style=background:white colspan=9 |
|-
|-  bgcolor="#FFBBBB"
| 2005-12-05 || Loss ||align=left| Wanlop Sitpholek || S1 World Tournament 2005, Semi Final || Bangkok, Thailand || Decision || 3 || 3:00 || 63-21-2
|-  bgcolor="#CCFFCC"
| 2005-12-05 || Win ||align=left| Paolo Balicha || S1 World Tournament 2005, Quarter Final || Bangkok, Thailand || Decision || 3 || 3:00 || 63-20-2
|-  bgcolor="#CCFFCC"
| 2005-11-22 || Win ||align=left| Nonthanun Por Pramuk || P.Pramuk Fights, Lumpinee Stadium || Bangkok, Thailand || KO || 1 || || 62-20-2
|-  bgcolor="#FFBBBB"
| 2005-09-15 || Loss ||align=left| Munkong Kiatsomkuan || S.Wanchard Fights, Rajadamnern Stadium || Bangkok, Thailand || Decision || 5 || 3:00 || 61-20-2
|-
|-  bgcolor="#FFBBBB"
| 2005-09-09 || Loss ||align=left| Buakaw Por. Pramuk || Xplosion 2005 || Hong Kong || Decision (Unanimous) || 5 || 3:00 || 61-19-2
|-
! style=background:white colspan=9 |
|-
|-  bgcolor="#FFBBBB"
| 2005-00-00 || Loss ||align=left| Munkong Kiatsomkuan ||  || Samut Sakhon Province, Thailand || Decision || 5 || 3:00 || 61-18-2
|-
|-  bgcolor="#CCFFCC"
| 2005-06-04 || Win ||align=left| Khunsuk Petchsupapan || Omnoi Stadium || Bangkok, Thailand || TKO (Ref stop) || 4 || || 61-17-2
|-  bgcolor="#FFBBBB"
| 2005-05-07 || Loss ||align=left| Farid Khider || Gala in Palais des Sports || Thiais, France || TKO (Ref stop) || 1 || || 60-17-2
|-  bgcolor="#FFBBBB"
| 2005-04-14 || Loss ||align=left| Jordan Tai || Phillip Lam Muay Thai Promotion || Auckland, New Zealand || TKO (Ref stop) || 1 || || 60-16-2
|-  bgcolor="#CCFFCC"
| 2005-03-25 || Win ||align=left| Khunsuk Petchsupaparn || Petchsupaparn Fights, Lumpinee Stadium || Bangkok, Thailand || Decision || 5 || 3:00 || 60-15-2
|-  bgcolor="#CCFFCC"
| 2005-02-18 || Win ||align=left| Khunsuk Petchsupaparn || Petchsupaparn Fights, Lumpinee Stadium || Bangkok, Thailand || Decision || 5 || 3:00 || 59-15-2
|-  bgcolor="#FFBBBB"
| 2004-12-05 || Loss ||align=left| Khunsuk Petchsupaparn || Kings Birthday: S1 -70 kg Tournament || Thailand || Decision || 3 || 3:00 || 58-15-2
|-  bgcolor="#CCFFCC"
| 2004-10-23 || Win ||align=left| Chris van Venrooij || SuperLeague Germany 2004 || Oberhausen, Germany || KO (Flying Knee) || 4 || || 58-14-2
|-  bgcolor="#FFBBBB"
| 2004-09-24 || Loss ||align=left| Shane Chapman || New Zealand vs France || Auckland, NZ || Decision || 5 || 3:00 || 57-14-2
|-  bgcolor="#CCFFCC"
| 2004-07-24 || Win ||align=left| Masaaki Kato || All Japan Kickboxing Federation || Tokyo, Japan || KO (Front kick) || 2 || 1:55 || 57-13-2
|-  bgcolor="#FFBBBB"
| 2004-06-05 || Loss ||align=left| Samir Mohamed || Le Grand Tournoi at Zénith || Paris, France || Decision || 7 || 2:00 || 56-13-2
|-  bgcolor="#CCFFCC"
| 2004-04-07 || Win ||align=left| Fuji Chalmsak || K-1 World MAX '04 Open || Tokyo, Japan || 2 Ext.R Decision (Unanimous) || 5 || 3:00 || 56-12-2
|-  bgcolor="#FFBBBB"
| 2004-03-04 || Loss ||align=left| John Wayne Parr || S1 World Championships '04, Semi Final || Bangkok, Thailand || TKO (Ref stop) || 3 || 0:40 || 55-12-2
|-  bgcolor="#CCFFCC"
| 2004-03-04 || Win ||align=left| Suriya Sor Ploenchit || S1 World Championships '04, Quarter Final || Bangkok, Thailand || Decision ||  || || 55-11-2
|-  bgcolor="#CCFFCC"
| 2003-10-07 || Win ||align=left| Khunsuk Petchsupaparn || SUK Petchsupaparn, Lumpinee Stadium || Bangkok, Thailand || TKO (Doc stop) || 4 || || 54-11-2
|-  bgcolor="#FFBBBB"
| 2003-07-31 || Loss ||align=left| Sakatpeth Sor Sakunpan || Rajadamnern Stadium || Bangkok, Thailand || KO (Referee Stoppage) || 1 || || 53-11-2
|-  bgcolor="#CCFFCC"
| 2003-06-19 || Win ||align=left| Chokdee Por Pramuk || Rajadamnern Stadium || Bangkok, Thailand || KO || 2 || || 53-10-2
|-  bgcolor="#CCFFCC"
| 2003-04-18 || Win ||align=left| Sak Kaoponlek || Grand tournoi des Moyens || Paris, France || KO  ||  || || 52-10-2
|-  bgcolor="#CCFFCC"
| 2003-03-03 || Win ||align=left| Sak Kaoponlek || Rajadamnern Stadium || Bangkok, Thailand || KO (Right uppercut) || 3 || || 51-10-2
|-
! style=background:white colspan=9 |
|-
|-  bgcolor="#CCFFCC"
| 2003-01-00 || Win ||align=left| Munkong Kiatsomkuan || Rajadamnern Stadium || Bangkok, Thailand || KO || 1 || || 50-10-2
|-  bgcolor="#CCFFCC"
| 2002-12-05 || Win ||align=left| Rambo-Jiew Por.Tabtim || Kings Birthday || Thailand || KO (Doc stop/elbow strike) || 3 || || 49-10-2
|-  bgcolor="#FFBBBB"
| 2002-07-07 || Loss ||align=left| Sak Kaoponlek || ISKA Kickboxing, Palais Omnisport Bercy || Paris, France || KO (Right highkick) || 4 || || 48-10-2
|-  bgcolor="#CCFFCC"
| 2002-04-13 || Win ||align=left| Orono Por Muang Ubon || Songkran : New year Celebration || Nakhon Ratchasima, Thailand || Decision || 5 || 3:00 || 48-9-2
|-  bgcolor="#c5d2ea"
| 2002-03-04 || Draw ||align=left| Orono Por Muang Ubon || Rajadamnern Stadium || Bangkok, Thailand || Decision draw || 5 || 3:00 || 47-9-2
|-  bgcolor="#CCFFCC"
| 2002-01-00 || Win ||align=left| Orono Por Muang Ubon ||  || Udon Thani, Thailand || TKO (Ref stop) || 3 || || 47-9-1
|-  bgcolor="#FFBBBB"
| 2001-11-22 || Loss ||align=left| Sak Kaoponlek ||  || Trieste, Italy || KO (Elbow) || 4 || || 46-9-1
|-
! style=background:white colspan=9 |
|-
|-  bgcolor="#FFBBBB"
| 2001-06-00 || Loss ||align=left| Eh Phoutong || Phnom Penh Stadium || Phnom Penh, Cambodia  || TKO (Ref stop) || 5 || || 46-8-1
|-  bgcolor="#FFBBBB"
| 2001-05-00 || Loss ||align=left| Satoshi Kobayashi ||  || Tokyo, Japan || KO || 2 || || 46-7-1
|-  bgcolor="#FFBBBB"
| 2001-04-00 || Loss ||align=left| Eh Phoutong ||  Phnom Penh Stadium || Phnom Penh, Cambodia  || TKO (Ref stop/elbow) || 3 || || 46-6-1
|-  bgcolor="#FFBBBB"
| 2001-03-26 || Loss ||align=left| Eh Phoutong || Phnom Penh Stadium || Phnom Penh, Cambodia || TKO (Ref stop/downward elbow) || 1 || 0:15 || 46-5-1
|-  bgcolor="#FFBBBB"
| 2000-12-05 || Loss ||align=left| Robert Kaennorasing || Kings Birthday || Bangkok, Thailand || Decision || 5 || 3:00 || 46-4-1
|-  bgcolor="#CCFFCC"
| 2000-06-08 || Win ||align=left| Robert Kaennorasing || Muay Thai in Las Vegas, The Venetian || Las Vegas, NV || KO (Left uppercut) || 1 || 2:23 || 46-3-1
|-
! style=background:white colspan=9 |
|-
|-  bgcolor="#CCFFCC"
| 2000-05-20 || Win ||align=left| Chalunlap || Muaythai in Grand Dôme || Villebon, France || Decision || 5 || 3:00 ||
|-  bgcolor="#CCFFCC"
| 1999-12-05 || Win ||align=left| Duan Esarn || Kings Birthday || Sanam Luang, Thailand || KO (High knee) || 5 || ||
|-
! style=background:white colspan=9 |
|-
|-  bgcolor="#CCFFCC"
| 1999-10-00 || Win ||align=left| Banca Pudying || France vs Thailand || Saint-Ouen, France || KO || 3 || ||
|-  bgcolor="#CCFFCC"
| 1999-07-00 || Win ||align=left| Konvichan ||  || Koh Samui, Thailand || KO || 1 || 1:30 ||
|-  bgcolor="#CCFFCC"
| 1999-00-00 || Win ||align=left| Alex Sneddon ||  || Saint-Ouen, France || KO || 1 || ||
|-  bgcolor="#CCFFCC"
| 1999-04-03 || Win ||align=left| Samir Gharbi ||  || France || KO || 2 || ||
|-  bgcolor="#CCFFCC"
| 1997-00-00 || Win ||align=left| Poniyom ||  || Thailand || KO ||  || ||
|-  bgcolor="#CCFFCC"
| 1997-08-00 || Win ||align=left| Apichaï ||  || Thailand || KO (Uppercut & Highkick) || 1 || ||
|-  bgcolor="#CCFFCC"
| 1997-07-28 || Win ||align=left| Lekpech || Chaweng Stadium || Koh Samui, Thailand || KO || 4 || ||
|-  bgcolor="#CCFFCC"
| 1996-03-09 || Win ||align=left| Benoit Atayi || European Muaythai Championship || Avignon, France || Decision || 5 || 3:00 ||
|-
! style=background:white colspan=9 |
|-
|-  bgcolor="#CCFFCC"
| 1996-01-19 || Win ||align=left| Kader Marouf || European Muaythai Championship || Levallois, France || TKO (Gave up) || 4 || ||
|-
! style=background:white colspan=9 |
|-
|-  bgcolor="#CCFFCC"
| 1995-11-17 || Win ||align=left|  || Muaythai Gala in Palais des Sports || Levallois, France || KO || 2 || ||
|-  bgcolor="#CCFFCC"
| 1995-00-00 || Win ||align=left| Ange N’Kemi ||  ||  || KO || 2 || ||
|-  bgcolor="#CCFFCC"
| 1995-00-00 || Win ||align=left| Fykri Tijarti ||  ||  || KO || 2 || ||
|-  bgcolor="#CCFFCC"
| 1995-00-00 || Win ||align=left| Jeff De Ling ||  ||  || KO || 2 || ||
|-  bgcolor="#CCFFCC"
| 1995-05-27 || Win ||align=left| Yigin Osman || European Muaythai Championship ||  || Decision || 5 || 3:00 ||
|-
! style=background:white colspan=9 |
|-
|-  bgcolor="#CCFFCC"
| 1995-00-00 || Win ||align=left| Khalil || French Championship || Nanterre, France || KO || 3 || ||
|-
! style=background:white colspan=9 |
|-
|-  bgcolor="#CCFFCC"
| 1995-01-00 || Win ||align=left| Jean-Luc Janvier ||  || Paris, France || KO (Uppercut) ||  || ||
|-  bgcolor="#CCFFCC"
|-  bgcolor="#CCFFCC"
| 1994-12-01 || Win ||align=left| Mohamed Yamani || Gala in Gymnase Japy || Paris, France || KO || 3 || ||
|-  bgcolor="#c5d2ea"
| 1994-00-00 || Draw ||align=left|  ||  || Thailand || Decision Draw ||  || ||
|-  bgcolor="#FFBBBB"
| 1994-00-00 || Loss ||align=left| Mustapha Mekboul ||  || France || KO ||  || ||
|-  bgcolor="#FFBBBB"
| 1994-00-00 || Loss ||align=left| Jean-Luc Janvier || French Championships, Quarter Final || France || Decision || 5 || ||
|-  bgcolor="#CCFFCC"
| 1992-02-00 || Win ||align=left| Karim Benattia ||  || Saint-Maur, France || Decision ||  || ||
|-
| colspan=9 | Legend:

See also
List of male kickboxers

References

External links
Best K-1 Website on the net
Jean-Charles Skarbowsky's Website

1975 births
Living people
French male kickboxers
Welterweight kickboxers
French Muay Thai practitioners
Sportspeople from Paris
French people of Romanian descent